Steve Ravic (born November 19, 1973) is an Australian film director, producer and editor, who is also known for his work in the music industry and public speaking and mentoring engagements.

After a career in investigative journalism and producing public television and radio, Ravic went on to create live concert coverage, music videos and feature ‘rockumentary’ films internationally since the 1990s.

He has collaborated with Neil Johnson on several film and music related projects and worked with various music artists all over the world including Edguy, Doro, Manowar, Gamma Ray, Rhapsody, Destruction, The Poodles, Dungeon, Paragon, Black Majesty and Thompson.

Having branched out from music related projects, Ravic began to focus on feature films, most recently working with artist Charles Billich on the documentary Billich: Beyond the Canvas and biopic My Way as well as action/thriller Hotel Underground.

Early life 
Ravic was (born Stipe Ravic on November 19, 1973) in the western suburbs of Melbourne, Australia to Croatian immigrants that fled  Yugoslavia. Ravic was raised in St. Albans (a suburb of Melbourne). Ravic grew up in and has become a prominent and active member of the Croatian diaspora community in Australia and has worked with numerous notable Australian Croatians as well as Croatians abroad.

Career 

In 2003 Ravic promoted a tour for German Metal singer Doro and also co directed and co-produced Doro: Für Immer (2003) and Doro: 20 Years Anniversary, A Warrior Soul (2006), originally broadcast on German TV and released on DVD in 2006.

In 2005/2006, Ravic was recruited by the Australian Government to be a peer / advisor for the Australia Council For The Arts. His duties included reviewing grant applications and providing professional advice on projects related to international touring for bands. Ravic eventually resigned his position to be able to focus on the his own projects.

In 2007, Ravic completed his first feature film Metal Warrior an off-beat street drama directed, written by and starring himself which was released theatrically in Australia in 2011.

In 2010 Frontier Records released Ravic's documentary on The Poodles, The Poodles: In The Flesh which released to awards and critical acclaim.

In 2016, Ravic completed comedy film Diary of a Fatman a comedy film starring Steven Haar which won several awards.

Most recently Ravic has completed a documentary on Charles Billich, Billich: Beyond The Canvas which premiered at the Cannes Film Festival Marche in 2019.

Continuing on from this, Ravic is currently working on a biopic about Charles Billich entitled My Way

References

External links 

Australian film directors
1973 births
Living people